Peninsula Compost Company, LLC is a commercial composting company set up to manage a 200,000 ton per year food waste facility which started operations in Wilmington, Delaware in 2009.  The facility is located at a 27-acre complex and was developed in partnership with local companies EDiS Construction and Port Contractors.  Waste Management announced a "strategic investment" in the facility in 2011.
Management
Brian Schaffer Executive Vice President
Nelson Widell VP Sales and Marketing 
Charles Gifford Managing Partner
Whitney Hall Engineer
Scott Woods CEO

References 

2006 establishments in Delaware
Industrial composting

https://www.reuters.com/article/us-composting/composting-center-plans-to-profit-from-food-waste-idUSTRE60C3QV20100114